Anasuya is a 2007 Telugu thriller directed and produced by Ravi Babu. It stars Bhumika Chawla, Ravi Babu, and Abbas. It was remade in Kannada as Anu.

Plot

Anasuya is an orphan. She is a young, passionate journalist who joins NTV as a reporter. She lives along with an old  house owner, Joseph in the city. On her first assignment she goes undercover, posing as a reporter from a women's magazine to expose suspected child labor in a local politician's house. Anasuya successfully exposes the oppressive working condition of an orphan child called Lakshmi who is forced into menial work at the politician's house. The politician throws the child out of his house to escape arrest. Anasuya shelters the girl and takes her home. The exposé becomes a sensation and Anasuya becomes a household name. She also becomes an instant favourite of her boss much to the irritation of her senior colleagues.

Around this time a series of murders were baffling the police department. The murderer was taking an internal organ from his victims and leaving a red rose behind. When the police get reluctant to give the press information Anasuya is given the task of be-friending task force officer Anand who was involved with the investigation and getting information out of him. Meanwhile, the killer comes to Anasuya's house, kills Joseph and takes his heart. He tries to kill Anasuya but she escapes from him tactically along with Lakshmi. After that Anasuya goes about her task diligently and even causes the arrest of Govind a polio stricken compounder in National Hospital as the serial murderer. But the cops release him, seeing that he was an invalid with polio-stricken legs. Not convinced with police theory Anasuya pursues Govind herself. Then she discovers that he is the murderer and feigns being stricken with polio. But he escapes successfully with the right kidney of a girl and kills two officers and that girl's boyfriend. Later Govind comes to Anasuya home again and tries to kill her. But Anasuya alerted this time and shoots Govind with Anand's gun. In a rough chase by cops he misleads the cops as himself dead in a cement mixture.

Later Govind tries to kill Anasuya again but while defending herself along with Lakshmi Anasuya accidentally injures an asthma patient who is in a critical condition. Because of this Anasuya lost her reputation and job and later no choice left Anand arrests Anasuya and takes her into remand. Later he bails her out. After out of jail she tries to unravel the mystery of Govind and hunt him down. Then she starts observing the style of murders and finds out that the people who were killed had organ transplantations done in the National Hospital. She enquires the hospital and discovers that all the organs are from the same person called Pooja. She enquires about Pooja in her hometown and Pooja's best friend reveals the past of Govind. She and Pooja were students of medicine in the National Hospital cum Medical College. In her first anatomy class she meets anatomy professor Dr. Amar. In the class he is attracted to Pooja and starts misbehaving with her in the name of love. After few sadistic approaches by Amar, Pooja complains to the board on his behaviour, but the board believes that Pooja is complaining falsely and warns her. Then one night in the college hostel Pooja is about to sleep, when suddenly Amar comes to her room and tells her that he is going to marry her on "Akshay Tritiya" because if any couple married in that auspicious day they will be together for many lives in future. Frightened, Pooja shouts and catches Amar red- handed with the help of her hostel mates. After the inquiry by the medical college Pooja goes to her hometown for semester holidays. Even there Amar follows her and gets beaten by the locals and her parents. But somehow he manages to escape and suddenly enters Pooja's house and he ties everyone including Pooja and beats everyone except Pooja and then Amar recognises the date of Akshay Tritiya is that day then he says that if on the day of Akshay Tritiya a couple marry then they may die together in that auspicious day then they will live together from there next lives then he cuts her nerves with a blade then he is about to cut his nerves then suddenly the crowd came into the house and bashes him hardly but he managed to escape from the crowd again then in the national hospital doctors declares Pooja's condition to be brain dead and tell her family to transplant her body organs as per the agreement she signed earlier in the college which they eventually accept. After the organs are donated, Pooja's dead body is taken away by Amar. Now coming back to the present Anasuya finds out that that Amar is none other than Govind. The reason why he leaves red roses by dead bodies is because of Pooja's fondness towards roses. In the other present  she hears a famous old song "Ee Theega Puvunu" from 'Maro Charitra'. Then Anasuya suddenly remembers that when Joseph died, she heard the same song from the 98.3 F.M Radio Mirchi which is dedicated to Pooja by a mysterious caller because she loves this song. Then she enquires in the 98.3 F.M office and finds out that he called them up to 5 times with the same phone number on during the dates of murders took place (This entite FM radio pattern is directly copied from South Korean classic thriller 'memories of murders'). After a failure to stop the 6th murder she finally realizes that it was Lakshmi the orphan girl who is being hunted by Govind for one final organ. Meanwhile, Govind after several failure attempts successfully kidnaps Lakshmi and takes her to his secret hideout.In the hideout with Pooja's dead body and the other body organs he tries to be good with frightened Lakshmi and promises her not kill her because Pooja loves kids and so does he. Then he reveals his plan that that current day is "Akshayatritiya" so after removing her right eye he fixes the body organs in the dead body he would burn himself along with Pooja's dead body so that they can live a happy life in the coming lives. He then tries to give anaesthesia to Lakshmi then suddenly find's out that Anasuya is on her way by tracing his phone number. She comes along with Anand and gives a tough fight finally Anasuya shoots him causing a major injury to him. A fire accident breaks out in the hideout. Pooja's dead body with some other body organs catch fire and are burned in the fire accident. Then  the helpless Govind dies with a broken heart. After that Anasuya proves her innocence and comes on to a media channel and discourages people who have such kind of thoughts. She encourages organ donation and sends out a message for people to not indulge in such kind of cruel intentions.

Cast
 Bhumika Chawla as Anasuya
 Ravi Babu as 'Gulabi Puvvu' Govind/Dr.Amar
 Abbas as Anand
 Nikitha as Pooja
 Suhani
 Shankar Melkote as Uncle Joseph
 Ankitha
 Sudeepa Pinky
 Chalapathi Rao as Dr. Mohan Das
Sameer Hasan as Chakravarthy, NTV's senior news reporter
 Sandhya Janak as Pooja's mother
 Natanya Singh as Item Girl

Soundtrack

Music was composed by Shekar Chandra. The song "Ye Theega Poovuno" from Maro Charitra (1978) was used in the film.

Release and reception
The film released to positive reviews and was recorded  as a hit at the box office, running for 50 days.

A critic from Rediff.com wrote that "On the whole, the attempt is sincere but Anasuya may not enthuse the lovers of formula flicks even though it provides a good respite from such films". Jeevi of Idlebrain.com wrote that "On a whole, Anasuya is a different film in thriller genre".

Awards

N. Sudhakar Reddy won the Nandi Special Jury Award for cinematography for the movie.

References

External links
 

2007 films
2007 thriller films
Telugu films remade in other languages
2000s Telugu-language films
Indian thriller films
2000s serial killer films
Indian serial killer films
Films directed by Ravi Babu